On April 21, 1823, William B. Rochester (DR) of  was appointed judge of the Eighth Circuit Court and resigned his seat in the House.  A special election was held to fill the resulting vacancy.

Election results

Woods took his seat on December 1, 1823, at the start of the 1st Session of the 18th Congress.

See also
List of special elections to the United States House of Representatives

References

Special elections to the 18th United States Congress
1823
New York 1823 28
1823 New York (state) elections
United States House of Representatives 1823 28
New York 28